Lore may refer to:

 Folklore, acquired knowledge or traditional beliefs
 Oral lore or oral tradition, orally conveyed cultural knowledge and traditions

Places
 Loré, former French commune
 Loré (East Timor), a city and subdistrict in Lautém District
 Lore City, Ohio

Arts and media
 Lore (Star Trek), a fictional android
 Lore (film), a 2012 Australian-German film
 Lore (podcast)
 Lore (TV series), based on the podcast
 Lore (Clannad album)
 Lore (Today I Caught the Plague album)
 Lore, a 2021 book by Alexandra Bracken

Other uses
 Lore (name), a list of people with the given name and surname
 Lore (anatomy), the region between the eyes and nostrils of birds, reptiles, and amphibians

See also
 Lores (disambiguation)
 Loure (disambiguation)
 Canon (fiction), the material accepted as officially part of a story